Prokopovo is a rural locality (a village) in Arkhangelskoye Rural Settlement, Sokolsky District, Vologda Oblast, Russia. The population was 19 as of 2002.

Geography 
Prokopovo is located 22 km northwest of Sokol (the district's administrative centre) by road. Vasilyovo is the nearest rural locality.

References 

Rural localities in Sokolsky District, Vologda Oblast